The Pflaum-McWilliams Mound Group, also known as the Edna Taylor Conservancy Mound Group, is a group of Native American mounds in Madison, Wisconsin. Located in the Edna Taylor Conservancy in southeast Madison, the group includes an animal effigy mound and six linear mounds. While a number of the linear mounds have been damaged, the group is generally well-preserved. The mounds were built during the Late Woodland period, most likely between 800 and 1100 A.D., and were thought to have been used for ceremonial purposes.

The mounds were added to the National Register of Historic Places on June 7, 1991.

References

External links

		
National Register of Historic Places in Madison, Wisconsin
Archaeological sites on the National Register of Historic Places in Wisconsin
Mounds in Wisconsin